David Navarro may refer to:

Dave Navarro (born 1967), American guitarist
David Navarro (basketball) (born 1983), Spanish basketball player
David Navarro (footballer) (born 1980), Spanish footballer
David Navarro (designer) (born 1974), Spanish designer

See also
 David Nabarro (born 1949), British medical doctor and diplomat